The 1989 West Berlin state election was held on 29 January 1989 to elect the members of the 11th Abgeordnetenhaus of Berlin. This was the last election held in West Berlin before the reunification of Germany and Berlin. The CDU suffered a severe defeat under its top candidate, the Governing Mayor Eberhard Diepgen, who had been in office since 1984. It fell by 8.7 percentage points and ended up with 37.7% of the votes just ahead of the SPD, which gained 4.9 percentage points to 37.3% under its lead candidate Walter Momper. Together with the Alternative List (AL), this resulted in a clear majority for a red–green coalition.

References 

State election, 1989
Berlin
1989 in Berlin
December 1989 events in Europe